Grymyrk is a demo and the debut release by Norwegian black metal band Thorns. It was recorded in June 1991 and released in the same month. The songs comprise parts played by electric guitar and bass guitar only.

Track listing 

 "Lovely Children" – 3:29
 "Fall" – 2:20
 "Thule" – 6:52
 "Fairytales" – 4:02
 "Home" – 6:43
 "You That Mingle May" – 2:40

 Note: The track "Lovely Children" is a re-recording of "Into the Promised Land" from the Luna de Nocturnus demo. The track "Home" has a melody that was inspired by Alphaville's A Victory of Love.

Personnel 

 Snorre W. Ruch – electric guitar
 Harald Eilertsen – bass guitar

References 

1992 albums
Thorns (band) albums
Demo albums